Tetramethylbutane, sometimes called hexamethylethane, is a hydrocarbon with formula C8H18 or (H3C-)3C-C(-CH3)3.  It is the most heavily branched and most compact of the many octane isomers, the only one with a butane (C4) backbone. Because of its highly symmetrical structure, it has a very high melting point and a short liquid range; in fact, it is the smallest saturated acyclic hydrocarbon that appears as a solid at a room temperature of 25 °C. (Among cyclic hydrocarbons, cubane, C8H8 is even smaller and is also solid at room temperature.)  It is also the most stable C8H18 isomer, with a heat of formation  lower than that of n-octane, a fact that has been attributed to stabilizing dispersive interactions (electron correlation) between the methyl groups (protobranching).

The compound can be obtained by reaction of Grignard reagent tert-Butylmagnesium bromide with ethyl bromide, or of ethylmagnesium bromide with tert-butyl bromide in the presence of manganese(II) ions. This transformation is believed to go through the dimerization of two tert-butyl radicals, which are generated by decomposition of the organomanganese compounds generated in situ.

The full IUPAC name of the compound is 2,2,3,3-tetramethylbutane, but the numbers are superfluous in this case because there is no other possible arrangement of "tetramethylbutane".

References

Alkanes